Pocket City is the debut album by the American musician Art Porter Jr., released in 1992. Porter Jr. supported the album by touring with Lisa Stansfield. Pocket City made Billboard'''s Contemporary Jazz Albums chart.

Production
The album was produced by Jeff Lorber. Porter Jr. composed eight of its songs. A video was shot for the title track.

Critical reception

The Chicago Tribune deemed the album "a suave, cool delight from finish to end, full of breezy and uptempo tunes as well as dreamy, romantic-type ballads." The Washington Post'' wrote: "After a couple half-hearted attempts at ballads, Porter comes up with the likable 'Passion Sunrise', but Porter and his backing band never really let loose, save on an upbeat cover of Maxi Priest's 1990 hit, 'Close to You'."

Track list
 Pocket City
 Inside Myself
 Unending
 Passion Sunrise
 Texas Hump
 Close to You
 Little People
 KGB
 Broken Promise
 Meltdown
 L.A.

Personnel
Art Porter: alto and soprano saxophones
Buzz Feiten: guitar
Paul Pesco: guitar
Oliver Leiber: guitar
Mark "Breeze" Shapiro: guitar
Alec Milstein: bass guitar
Paulinho Da Costa: percussion
Guy Eckstine: percussion
Brigitte McWilliams: backing vocals
Valerie Davis: backing vocals

References

Art Porter Jr. albums
1992 albums